The 2012–13 Irish SuperLeague season was the 40th running of Basketball Ireland's premier men's basketball competition. The season featured 8 teams from across the Republic of Ireland, with the regular season beginning on 28 September 2012 and ending on 9 March 2013. With a first-place finish and a 16–5 win–loss record, UL Eagles were crowned league champions for the second straight year. Neptune were crowned National Cup champions for the first time in 21 years, while UCC Demons won the inaugural season finale Champions Trophy tournament.

Teams

Regular season

Standings

Source: SportsNewsIRELAND

Champions Trophy

Bracket

Semi-finals

Source: RTE

Final

Source: RTE

National Cup

Semi-finals

Final

SuperLeague Select Team

Ireland vs England
In January 2013, the SuperLeague Select Team travelled to Birmingham, England to play against the England Select Team in the BBL Cup Final curtain-raiser. The match took place at the National Indoor Arena on Sunday 13 January, with tip off at 12:30pm.

Team
Shane Coughlan (UCC Demons)
Niall O'Reilly (UCC Demons)
Robert Taylor (UL Eagles)
Jason Killeen (UL Eagles)
Rob Lynch (UL Eagles)
Neil Campbell (UL Eagles)
Darren Townes (Neptune)
Michael McGinn (Neptune)
Ger Noonan (Neptune)
Mindaugas Tamušauskas (Dublin Inter)
Keith Anderson (DCU Saints)
Mike Westbrooks (Killester)
Cian Nihill (reserve player) (Moycullen)

Head Coach: Mark Keenan (UL Eagles)
Assistant Coaches: Jerome Westbrooks (Killester) and John King

Game data

Awards

Player of the Month

Coach of the Month

Statistics leaders

Regular season
 Player of the Year: Ger Noonan (Neptune)
 Young Player of the Year: Keith Anderson (DCU Saints)
 Coach of the Year: Mark Scannell (Neptune)

References

Irish
Super League (Ireland) seasons
Basket
Basket